Ghosi comes under Mau district of Uttar Pradesh State. It belongs to Azamgarh Division . It is located 24 KM towards North from District head quarters Mau. It is a Block head quarter.

Ghosi Pin code is 275304 and postal head office is Ghosi (Mau).

Gauri (1 KM), Somaridih (1 KM), Dharauli (2 KM), Bhatauli Malik (2 KM), Bhawanpur (2 KM) are the nearby Villages to Ghosi. Ghosi is surrounded by Badraon Block towards west, Kopaganj Block towards South, Dohri Ghat Block towards North, Fatehpur Madaun Block towards East.

 Adari, Rudrapur, Azamgarh, Lar are the nearby Cities to Ghosi.

This Place is in the border of the Mau District and Azamgarh District.  Azmatgarh is west towards this place. 
Ghosi is known for its Islamic educational centres.

Economy
Ghosi had a population of around 50,433 in the 2011 census. Ghosi has a mixed community, with 69% Muslims and 31% Hindus. . As at the 2011 census, out of total population, 12,387 were engaged in work or business activity. Of this 8,850 were males while 3,537 were females. In census survey, worker is defined as person who does business, job, service, and cultivator and labour activity. Of total 12387 working population, 86.62% were engaged in Main Work while 13.38% of total workers were engaged in Marginal Work.

Education

Colleges in Ghosi
Kul Govindi Devi Inter College
Jamia Amjadia
GIIT Near Gandhi Tiraha Majhwara Morh
Sarvodaya Inter College
Shamsul Oloom Niswan Arabic College
Darul Uloom Khairiya Faiz-e-Aam
Jamia Shamsul Oloom Ghosi
Ram Lagan Mahavidyalaya
Ram Lagan PG College

Schools in Ghosi
St. Xaviers High School, Ghosi
Little Flower Children School, Ghosi  
St. Norbert School, Ghosi
M.R.D Public School, Ghosi
GM Convent High School, Ghosi
Ram Lagan senior secondary school
National Montessori School

Transport

By rail
Ghosi has one railway station called Ghosi Railway Station Which connected with Indara jn and Dohrighat Railway Station. (Track: Construction - Gauge Conversion)
Nearest Railway Stations 
Indara Junction railway station (IAA) Distance - Mau (UTTAR PRADESH) 16 kms
Mau Junction railway station (MAU) Distance - Mau (UTTAR PRADESH) 20 kms
Azamgarh railway station (AMH) Distance - Azamgarh (UTTAR PRADESH) 39 kms

By road
Ghosi is well connected with state capital by road. Ghosi is 303 KM from Lucknow.
Ghosi Bus Station is located on NH 29, Jamalpur, Ghosi, Uttar Pradesh, India

Major Highways
National Highway 29

By air
Nearby Airport
Gorakhpur Airport, Gorakhpur	45 Km 
Azamgarh Airport, Azamgarh 58 KM
Lal Bahadur Shastri Airport, Varanasi 64 Km
Allahabad Airport, Allahabad 123 Km

Gallery 

Cities and towns in Mau district